Retinoic acid-induced protein 2 is a protein that in humans is encoded by the RAI2 gene.

Retinoic acid plays a critical role in development, cellular growth, and differentiation. The specific function of this intronless, retinoic acid-induced gene has not yet been determined; however, it has been suggested to play a role in development. Localization of this gene designates it to be a candidate for diseases such as Nance-Horan syndrome, sensorineural deafness, non-specific X-linked mental retardation, oral-facial-digital syndrome, and Fried syndrome.

References

Further reading